Sartirana Lomellina is a comune (municipality) in the Province of Pavia in the Italian region Lombardy, located about 60 km southwest of Milan and about 40 km west of Pavia. As of 31 December 2004, it had a population of 1,837 and an area of 29.5 km².

Sartirana Lomellina borders the following municipalities: Bozzole, Breme, Mede, Semiana, Torre Beretti e Castellaro, Valle Lomellina, Valmacca.

Demographic evolution

Twin towns
Sartirana Lomellina is twinned with:

  Blainville-sur-Orne, France, since 2007

References

Cities and towns in Lombardy